Hickmanolobus is a genus of Australian araneomorph spiders in the family Orsolobidae, and was first described by Raymond Robert Forster & Norman I. Platnick in 1985.

Species
 it contains five species, found only in Tasmania, New South Wales, and Queensland:
Hickmanolobus ibisca Baehr & Smith, 2008 – Australia (Queensland, New South Wales)
Hickmanolobus jojo Baehr & Smith, 2008 – Australia (New South Wales)
Hickmanolobus linnaei Baehr & Smith, 2008 – Australia (New South Wales)
Hickmanolobus mollipes (Hickman, 1932) (type) – Australia (Tasmania)
Hickmanolobus nimorakiotakisi Baehr, Raven & Hebron, 2011 – Australia (Queensland)

See also
 List of Orsolobidae species

References

Araneomorphae genera
Orsolobidae
Spiders of Australia
Taxa named by Raymond Robert Forster